Raul Cano Pangalangan (born September 1, 1958) is a Filipino lawyer, and a retired  judge of the International Criminal Court. A graduate of Political Science and Law from the University of the Philippines, Pangalangan received his Law master's degree (1986) and doctorate (1990) from Harvard Law School. He became the dean of the University of the Philippines College of Law at UP Diliman from 1995 to 2005 and was the publisher of the Philippine Daily Inquirer.

Pangalangan was elected as a judge of the ICC on June 24, 2015. He was sworn in as a judge on July 13, 2015 and is set to serve in the position until March 10, 2021. Continues in office until 16 May 2021 to finish ongoing proceedings in accordance with paragraph 10, article 36 of the Rome Statute.

References

1958 births
Living people
International Criminal Court judges
University of the Philippines Diliman alumni
Harvard Law School alumni
Academic staff of the University of the Philippines
University of the Philippines College of Law alumni
20th-century Filipino lawyers
21st-century Filipino judges
Filipino newspaper publishers (people)
Philippine Daily Inquirer people
Filipino judges of international courts and tribunals
Members of the Institut de Droit International